Alfonso Giacomo Gaspare Corti (15 June 1822 – 2 October 1876) was an Italian anatomist. He born at Gambarana, near Pavia in 1822.

Education
A famous friend of Corti's father, Antonio Scarpa, may have kindled his boyhood interest in anatomy and medicine. As a medical student he enrolled first at the University of Pavia. Corti's favorite study there was microanatomy with Bartolomeo Panizza and Mario Rusconi. In 1845, against paternal wishes, Corti moved to Vienna to complete his medical studies and to work in the anatomical institute of Joseph Hirtl. There he received the degree in medicine in 1847 under the supervision of professor Hyrtl, with a thesis on the bloodstream system of a reptile.

Career
He was then appointed by Hyrtl to be his Second Prosector. With the outbreak of the 1848 Revolution he left Vienna, and after brief military service in Italy made visits to eminent scientists in Bern, London, and Paris. At the beginning of 1850 Corti had received the invitation of the anatomist Albert Kölliker and had moved to Würzburg, where he made friends with Virchow. At the Kölliker Laboratory he began to work on the mammalian auditory system. Corti spent a short time in Utrecht, where he visited Professors Jacobus Schroeder van der Kolk and Pieter Harting. During his stay he learned to use methods to preserve several preparations of the cochlea. From Utrecht he returned to Würzburg to complete his study of at least 200 cochleas of man and different animals. His famous paper, "Recherches sur l'organe de l'ouïe des mammiferes",
appeared in 1851 in Kölliker's journal "Zeitschrift für wissenschaftliche Zoologie".

Marriage, children, illness and death
In the same year, after the death of his father, he inherited his father's estate and the title "Marchese de San Stefano Belbo" and moved back to Italy. In 1855 Corti married the daughter from a neighboring estate, Maria Bettinzoli. His young wife presented him with a daughter Bianca, and a son Gaspare, but in 1861 she died, leaving him with the responsibility of rearing the children. Unfortunately he was gradually developing arthritis deformans. Corti's last 15 years were further darkened by the inexorable progress of his crippling illness. In 1876, on the second of October, he died at Corvino San Quirico.

References

Further reading

1822 births
1876 deaths
University of Pavia alumni
Italian anatomists
Physicians from Pavia
19th-century Italian physicians